See also other people called Tony Snell (disambiguation).

Flight Lieutenant Anthony Noel Snell  (19 March 1922 – 4 August 2013), was a British RAF pilot during the Second World War. He flew in the North African campaign in 1942 and was shot down during the Allied invasion of Sicily in 1943. Initially captured by the Germans he escaped from a firing squad but was recaptured. He again escaped German captivity whilst in Italy and became one of the very few men to be awarded the DSO exclusively for escaping from the enemy.

Second World War
Snell was born in Tunbridge Wells, Kent, in 1922 and attended Cheltenham College. In November 1940 he volunteered for the RAF and was shipped to the United States for pilot training under the "Arnold" Scheme.

North Africa
Snell returned to Britain during the summer of 1942 and joined No. 242 Squadron RAF flying Spitfires. In October 1942 his unit was transferred to North Africa to provide air cover for the Operation Torch landings. For the rest of 1942 and into early 1943, Snell's squadron provided air interception and ground attack sorties in support of the British First Army as it drove towards Tunis.

Sicily
After the capitulation of Axis forces in May 1943, 242 Squadron was reassigned to Malta to refit for Operation Husky, the invasion of Sicily. On 10 July 1943, Snell was detailed to provide air cover over the Allied beachhead but was 'bounced' by German Messerschmitt 109 fighters. His Spitfire was hit and he crash landed in enemy territory.

He initially ran into an Italian patrol and then a German one that fired at him. In his attempt to escape from the Germans he found he had hidden in a minefield. After slowly finding his way out of the minefield he was captured by the Germans near an airfield. Thinking Snell was a spy they intended to execute him. Snell made another run for it and managed to again escape but was wounded in the right shoulder.

Escape from captivity
Weakened by his wound Snell was recaptured but this time was able to prove he was an Allied pilot. Treated for his wounds he was later transferred to a military hospital in Lucca. After Italy surrendered in September 1943 the Germany Army took control of the prison camp, and directed that the prisoners be transferred by train to Germany. While other prisoners on the train distracted the guards Snell, along with Major Per Lewis, escaped through a small window. The following morning they found they were near Mantua. After a six-day walk they encountered members of the Italian resistance movement near the small village of Fabrico, who helped them hide in a safe house in Modena for almost two months. With help from the resistance the pair gradually made it to the Swiss border, and they returned to Britain in November 1944. Lewis was mentioned in despatches on 1 January 1945, and Snell was awarded the Distinguished Service Order, a rare example of the award given for escaping from the enemy.

Snell spent time in hospital recuperating and later joined No. 504 Squadron RAF flying Gloster Meteor jet fighters. The squadron was assigned to Germany just after hostilities ceased and Snell remained August 1946 until discharged from the RAF a short while later.

Post war
Snell travelled through Africa and met his future wife Jackie in New York in 1964. They travelled together in the United States and Mexico. He worked as an actor in films and theatre, and also as a songwriter and entertainer throughout his life. He recorded the album An Englishman Abroad whilst in New York. Returning to the UK in 1966, Snell and Jackie moved to Ibiza where they ran a charter service on a catamaran they had sailed there. In 1970 he moved to the British Virgin Islands to run an unsuccessful boat charter company.

His wife had opened a restaurant called The Last Resort which burnt down. Selling everything left in Ibiza the Snells rebuilt the restaurant into a success. Snell continued to provide entertainment to patrons up until his death.

He wrote an account of his life in Spitfire Troubadour.

Distinguished Service Order citation
 23 July 1946 – Flight Lieutenant Anthony Noel Snell (119146), Royal Air Force Volunteer Reserve

References

1922 births
2013 deaths
Royal Air Force officers
Companions of the Distinguished Service Order
World War II prisoners of war held by Germany
British World War II prisoners of war
Escapees from German detention
British escapees
Royal Air Force personnel of World War II
People educated at Cheltenham College
People from Royal Tunbridge Wells
British Virgin Islands businesspeople
Military personnel from Kent